The 2011 Aegon Trophy was a professional tennis tournament played on outdoor grass courts. It was part of the 2011 ATP Challenger Tour and the 2011 ITF Women's Circuit. It took place in Nottingham, Great Britain between May 28 and June 5, 2011.

ATP entrants

Seeds

Rankings are as of May 23, 2011.

Other entrants
The following players received wildcards into the singles main draw:
  Daniel Cox
  Daniel Evans
  Joshua Milton
  Bernard Tomic

The following players received entry from the qualifying draw:
  Alex Kuznetsov
  Conor Niland
  Yūichi Sugita
  James Ward

WTA entrants

Seeds 

 Rankings as of 23 May 2011

Other entrants 
The following players received wildcards into the singles main draw:
  Naomi Broady
  Katie O'Brien
  Laura Robson
  Emily Webley-Smith

The following players received entry from the qualifying draw:
  Melinda Czink
  Julia Glushko
  Lu Jingjing
  Samantha Murray

Champions

Men's singles

 Gilles Müller def.  Matthias Bachinger, 7–6(4), 6–2

Women's singles

 Eleni Daniilidou def.  Olga Govortsova, 1–6, 6–4, 6–2

Men's doubles

 Colin Fleming / Ross Hutchins def.  Dustin Brown /  Martin Emmrich, 4–6, 7–6(8), [13–11]

Women's doubles

 Kimiko Date-Krumm /  Zhang Shuai def.  Raquel Kops-Jones /  Abigail Spears, 6–4, 7–6(7)

References
Official website
ITF Search
ATP official site

Aegon Trophy
Aegon Trophy
2011 in English tennis
Aegon Trophy